C-X-C chemokine receptor type 6 is a protein that in humans is encoded by the CXCR6 gene. CXCR6 has also recently been designated CD186 (cluster of differentiation 186).

CXCR6 has been identified as an entry coreceptor used by HIV-1 and SIV to enter target cells, in conjunction with CD4.  It is a minor coreceptor for HIV-1, nearly all strains of which use CCR5 and/or CXCR4.  Most SIV strains can use CXCR6 and recent evidence suggests that in monkeys that serve as the natural hosts of SIV, CXCR6 may be a major coreceptor.  CXCR6 was previously known as "Bonzo" and "STRL33" in the HIV/SIV field.

References

Further reading

External links 
 
 

Clusters of differentiation
Chemokine receptors